5J or 5-J may refer to:

 Cebu Pacific (IATA code), a Philippine airline
 5J engines, a product of Škoda Fabia
 Secondary State Highway 5J, former name for Washington State Route 702
 Destiny of the Daleks (production code: 5J), a 1979 Doctor Who serial

See also
 Q-5J, a model of Nanchang Q-5
 BD-5J, a model of Bede BD-5
 Martin SV-5J, a model of Martin Marietta X-24 
 J5 (disambiguation)